The Tukums II–Jelgava Railway is a  long,  gauge railway built in the 20th century to connect Tukums and Jelgava.

References 

Railway lines in Latvia
Jelgava
Railway lines opened in 1904
1900s establishments in Latvia
5 ft gauge railways in Latvia